Stephen Wyatt (born 26 March 1950) is an Australian weightlifter. He competed in the men's heavyweight event at the 1976 Summer Olympics.

References

External links
 

1950 births
Living people
Australian male weightlifters
Olympic weightlifters of Australia
Weightlifters at the 1976 Summer Olympics
Place of birth missing (living people)
Commonwealth Games medallists in weightlifting
Weightlifters at the 1974 British Commonwealth Games
Weightlifters at the 1978 Commonwealth Games
Commonwealth Games silver medallists for Australia
Commonwealth Games bronze medallists for Australia
20th-century Australian people
21st-century Australian people
Medallists at the 1974 British Commonwealth Games
Medallists at the 1978 Commonwealth Games